David Ludwig (born 24 December 1957) is an American physician in Boston, Massachusetts.

Education
Ludwig received a PhD and an MD from Stanford University School of Medicine. He completed an internship and residency in pediatrics and a fellowship in pediatric endocrinology at Boston Children's Hospital.

Career
Ludwig is a professor of pediatrics at the Harvard Medical School and a professor of nutrition at the Harvard School of Public Health. Ludwig is also the Director of the New Balance Foundation Obesity Prevention Center Boston Children's Hospital. He has published several studies about the causes of obesity in children and adults, and attracted attention for his recommendation that severely obese children be removed from the custody of their parents. He is a paid associate editor of the American Journal of Clinical Nutrition and a research editor of The BMJ.

Ludwig is the author of several consumer books about nutrition, diet, and health including Always Hungry?, Always Delicious, Retrain Your Fat Cells, and Lose Weight Permanently.

He is a proponent of the carbohydrate–insulin model of obesity.

See also
Hereditary factors in childhood obesity

References

External links

1957 births
Diet food advocates
Harvard Medical School faculty
Living people
Obesity researchers
Stanford University alumni